"5 Miles to Empty" is a single by American R&B vocal group Brownstone from their second album, Still Climbing (1997). Released on May 5, 1997, the song reached number 39 on the US Billboard Hot 100 and number six on the Billboard Hot R&B Singles chart.  It also charted at number 12 on the UK Singles Chart and number five in New Zealand.

Formats and track listings
CD single
 "5 Miles to Empty" (Radio Edit) – 3:45
 "5 Miles to Empty" (Cutfather & Joe Remix Up) – 4:19
 "5 Miles to Empty" (Cutfather & Joe Remix Smooth) – 4:12
 "5 Miles to Empty" (Do Me Remix) – 4:38
 "5 Miles to Empty" (Dark Child Remix) – 4:11

12-inch maxi
 "5 Miles to Empty" (Cutfather & Joe Remix Up) – 4:19
 "5 Miles to Empty" (Cutfather & Joe Remix Smooth) – 4:12
 "5 Miles to Empty" (Radio Edit) – 3:45
 "5 Miles to Empty" (Do Me Remix) – 4:38
 "5 Miles to Empty" (Dark Child Remix) – 4:11

CD maxi
 "5 Miles to Empty" (Radio Edit) – 3:45
 "5 Miles to Empty" (Cutfather & Joe Remix Up) – 4:19
 "5 Miles to Empty" (Cutfather & Joe Remix Smooth) – 4:12
 "5 Miles to Empty" (Do Me Remix) – 4:38
 "5 Miles to Empty" (Dark Child Remix) – 4:11

CD maxi – Remixes
 "5 Miles to Empty" (Dark Child Remix) – 4:11
 "5 Miles to Empty" (Do Me Remix) – 4:38
 "5 Miles to Empty" (Dark Child Instrumental) – 4:11
 "5 Miles to Empty" (Do Me Instrumental) – 4:38
 "5 Miles to Empty" (Album Version) – 5:11

Charts

Weekly charts

Year-end charts

Release history

References

1997 singles
1997 songs
Brownstone (group) songs